GRB 050904 is one of the most distant events ever observed, as of 2005. 
This gamma ray burst (GRB) occurred in the constellation Pisces. 
The bright γ-ray flash, lasting about 200 seconds, was detected on September 4, 2005 by the Swift Gamma-Ray Burst Mission.
The GRB has a redshift of z=6.295. Such a high redshift means that the burst happened
nearly 13 billion years ago.
Therefore, the GRB exploded when the Universe was an infant (890 million years old according to the most recent estimates), about 6% of its current age.
By comparison, the most distant galaxy and the most distant quasar ever observed, as of 2005, had a redshift of 6.96 and 6.43, respectively.

Three different groups of researchers, led by Giancarlo Cusumano, Joshua Haislip, and Nobuyuki Kawai respectively, carried out the investigation of the phenomenon and presented their results in Nature magazine on March 9, 2006.

See also
GRB 080913 
GRB 090423

External links
 Most distant explosion detected, smashes previous record (SWIFT @ Goddard, NASA)
 Star Death Beacon at the Edge of the Universe (ESO Press Release)
 Most Distant Explosion Detected, Smashes Previous Record (NASA)
 Swift Newsletter 
 Scientists Piece Together the Most Distant Cosmic Explosion

050904
Pisces (constellation)
20050904
September 2005 events